Poggio Filippo is a frazione of Tagliacozzo in the Province of L'Aquila in the Abruzzo, region of Italy.

Frazioni of Tagliacozzo